"Adrienne" is the second single from American rock band the Calling's debut album, Camino Palmero. When Aaron Kamin and Alex Band wrote the song, they both had girls in mind, but according to the band, they changed the name in the song to "Adrienne" because they did not want to get sued. Released on April 15, 2002, "Adrienne" reached number 16 on the US Billboard Bubbling Under Hot 100 and was a minor hit in Europe and Australia.

Music video
In the music video, the Calling perform outside while a group of people stand in line taking turns "singing" a duet with Alex Band. At the end of the video, a girl goes up and falls, and everyone else in line falls like dominoes.

Track listings

UK CD and cassette single
 "Adrienne" (radio mix) – 3:59
 "The One" – 3:46
 "Adrienne" (acoustic version) – 3:47

European CD single 1
 "Adrienne" (radio edit) – 3:59
 "Adrienne" (video) – 4:30

European CD single 2
 "Adrienne" (radio edit) – 3:59
 "Adrienne" (acoustic version) – 3:47
 "Adrienne" (video) – 4:30

European maxi-CD single
 "Adrienne" (radio edit) – 3:59
 "Adrienne" (acoustic version) – 4:42
 "The One" – 3:46
 "Adrienne" (video) – 4:30

Australian CD single
 "Adrienne" (radio edit) – 3:59
 "Adrienne" (adult mix) – 3:59
 "Lost" – 3:48
 "Adrienne" (acoustic version) – 4:42

Charts

Release history

References

2001 songs
2002 singles
The Calling songs
RCA Records singles
Songs written by Aaron Kamin
Songs written by Alex Band